Maple Ridge Township is the name of a few townships in the United States:

Maple Ridge Township, Alpena County, Michigan
Maple Ridge Township, Delta County, Michigan
Maple Ridge Township, Beltrami County, Minnesota
Maple Ridge Township, Isanti County, Minnesota

Township name disambiguation pages